Sound System is a box set collection by the Clash released in September 2013. The box contains the band's studio albums (but excludes the post-breakup album Cut the Crap) newly re-mastered by Mick Jones, with a further three discs featuring demos, non-album singles, rarities and B-sides, a DVD with previously unseen footage by both Don Letts and Julien Temple, original promo videos and live footage, plus an owner's manual booklet, reprints of the band's original 'Armagideon Times' fanzine and merchandise including dog tags, badges, stickers and a poster. The boom box packaging was designed by Paul Simonon. The set was released simultaneously with 5 Album Studio Set, which contains only the five studio albums, and a greatest hits package titled The Clash Hits Back.

In a September 2013 interview, Mick Jones announced the box sets and hits package will be the final time he works on anything involving the Clash and their music. "I'm not even thinking about any more Clash releases. This is it for me, and I say that with an exclamation mark," Jones said.

Remastering
Mick Jones said, "The concept of the whole thing is best box set ever. Re-mastering's a really amazing thing. That was the musical point of it all, because there's so much there that you wouldn't have heard before. It was like discovering stuff, because the advances in mastering are so immense since the last time [the Clash catalogue] was remastered in the 90s."

All the music has been remastered from the original tapes, Jones said. "We had to bake the tapes beforehand – the oxide on them is where the music is, so if you don't put them in the oven and bake them, that all falls off, because they're so old."

Bassist Simonon highlighted a guitar line on "Safe European Home", from the band's second album Give 'Em Enough Rope, saying he'd never even heard it before. "It's probably some session musician, while I was asleep," Jones joked.

Reception 

PopMatters journalist J.C. Maçek III wrote "The initial interest may come in the fact that the packaging looks like a classic Boom Box emblazoned with 'THE CLASH' in a military stencil with the overall box decorated in a Combat Rock reminiscent camouflage. This is definitely a visual treat for Clash fans to add to their mantle."

Rob Sheffield of Rolling Stone said "It takes a band as myth-saturated as the Clash to live up to a career-summing box as ambitious as this one. But Joe Strummer and his crew of London gutter-punk romantics fit the bill."

The Telegraph's Patrick Sawer wrote "The tracks, remastered by the band’s guitarist Mick Jones and Tim Young (who won a Grammy for his work on the Beatles 2006 Love album), sound fresh as ever, crisper even. Jones, the official muso of the band, said that during the remastering process he discovered guitar lines he couldn’t remember and previously buried instrumental details certainly stand out – along with Strummer’s biting ad-libs."

Track listing 

Tracks 10–15 from Sound System extras disc 3 are incorrectly credited as dating from December 1979.

Bonus DVD
Julien Temple Archive – 6:15

White Riot Promo Film (Promo and interview with Tony Parsons) – 7:11
1977
White Riot
London's Burning

Sussex University '77 – 8:29 (previously unreleased)
I'm So Bored with the USA
Hate & War
Career Opportunities
Remote Control

Don Letts Super 8 Medley – 11:45
White Riot
Janie Jones
City of the Dead
Clash City Rockers
White Man in Hammersmith Palais
1977

Clash on Broadway – 22:31
London Calling
This Is Radio Clash
The Magnificent Seven
The Guns of Brixton
Safe European Home

Promo Videos – 37:37
Tommy Gun
London Calling
Bankrobber
Clampdown (Live)
Train in Vain (Live)
The Call Up
Rock the Casbah
Radio Clash
Should I Stay or Should I Go (Live at Shea Stadium)
Career Opportunities (Live at Shea Stadium)

Personnel

The Clash
 Joe Strummer − backing vocals, bass guitar, lead guitar, lead vocals, piano, rhythm guitar, vocals 
 Mick Jones − backing vocals, harmonica, lead guitar, lead vocals, piano, vocals 
 Paul Simonon − backing vocals, bass guitar, lead vocals, rhythm guitar, vocals 
 Topper Headon − bass guitar, drums, percussion, piano, vocals 
 Tory Crimes (Terry Chimes) − drums 
 
Featured artists
 Mikey Dread – backing vocals, lead vocals, vocals 
 Tymon Dogg – piano, vocals, violin 
 Ellen Foley – backing vocals, lead vocals, vocals 
 Futura 2000 – vocals 
 Luke & Ben Gallagher – vocals 
 Maria Gallagher – vocals 
 Allen Ginsberg – vocals 
 Den Hegarty (Darts) – vocals 
 Joe Ely – backing vocals 
 Kosmo Vinyl – vocals 
 Ivan Julian – guitar 
 Noel "Tempo" Bailey (aka Sowell) – guitar 
 Allen Lanier – piano 
 Mickey Gallagher – keyboards, Organ, piano 
 Poly Mandell (Tommy Mandel) – keyboards 
 Norman Watt-Roy – bass
 The Irish Horns – brass 
 Gary Barnacle – saxophone 
 Davey Payne – saxophone 
 Arthur Edward "Bill" Barnacle – trumpet 
 Lew Lewis – harmonica 
 Band Sgt. Dave Yates 
 Battersea 
 Gerald Baxter-Warman 
 Tim Curry 
 Ray Gasconne 
 Rudolph Adolphus Jordan 
 Terry McQuade 
 Anthony Nelson Steelie 
 Jody Winscott 

 Composers: Mose Allison, Clive Alphonso, Michael Campbell, The Clash, Sonny Curtis, Clement Dodd, Tymon Dogg, Mikey Dread, Jackie Edwards, Robert Ellen, Eddy Grant, Topper Headon, Frederick Hibbert, FBooker T. Jones, Mick Jones, Keith Levine, Jackie Mittoo, Junior Murvin, Lee "Scratch" Perry, Danny Ray, Paul Simonon, Joe Strummer, Vince Taylor, Wilbert Williams

Production
 Engineering: Joe Blaney, Gregg Caruso, Kevin Dalimore, Dennis Ferranti, Eddie Garcia, Jerry Green, Simon Humphreys, Glyn Johns, Lancelot "Maxie" McKenzie, Chris Mingo, J.P. Nickolson, Bill Price, Corky Stasiak, Paul Subblebine, and Julien Temple 
 Editing: Robin Banks, Pablo D'Ambrosie, and Kris Needs 
 Mixing: Mikey Dread, Glyn Johns, Bill Price, Corky Stasiak, and Richard Whittaker 
 Remastering: The Clash, Mick Jones, Paul Stubblebine, and Tim Young 
 Sound Effects: Steve Bell 
 Art Editor: Robert Gordon McHarg III 
 Artwork: Mikey Dread, Eddie, Gene Greif, Jules, Robert Gordon McHarg III, Chris Musto, Kate Simon, Paul Simonon, and Joe Strummer 
 Design: Hugh Brown, The Clash, Wes Geral, Gene Greif, Jules, Ray Lowry, Robert Gordon McHarg III, Robbin Panks, Terry Razor, and Paul Simonon 
 Liner Notes: The Baker, Robin Banks, John Cooper Clarke, Mikey Dread, Johnny Green, Topper Headon, Mick Jones, Ray Jordan, Don Letts, Alex Michon, Bill Price, Chris Salewicz, Paul Simonon, Pennie Smith, Joe Strummer, Julien Temple, Tim Young, and Kosmo Vinyl 
 Photography: M. Arscott, Jane Ashley, Hugh Brown, Caroline Coon, Bob Gruen, Sho Kikuchi, Krystyna Kolowska, Grzegorz Lepiarz, Des Letts, Rocco Macauley, Kate Simon, Paul Slattery, Pennie Smith, Joe Strummer, Julien Temple, and Julian Yewdall 
 Cartoonist: Steve Bell 
 Layout: Chris Musto 
 Executive Producer: Don Letts 
 Producers: Ama Chana, The Clash, Micky Foote, Sandy Pearlman, and Guy Stevens 
 Project Manager: Joanna Kalli 
 Project Consultant: Andy Street 
 Consultant: Bill Price 
 Assistants: Steve Levine, Joe Pullen 
 A&R: Bruce Dickinson and Matt Gibbon

Charts

References

External links

 

2013 compilation albums
Albums produced by Sandy Pearlman
Albums produced by Bill Price (record producer)
Albums produced by Guy Stevens
The Clash compilation albums
Legacy Recordings compilation albums